The SRT Light Red Line, or Nakhon Withi Line is part of the SRT Red Lines suburban railway system serving the greater Bangkok Metropolitan Region running for  between Krung Thep Aphiwat Central Terminal and Taling Chan. When completed, the  line will run east–west from Sala Ya in Phutthamonthon District of Nakhon Pathom Province to Hua Mak railway station in Bangkok.

The segment from Taling Chan to Bang Son previously opened for limited, free trial service between 5 December 2012 and 13 January 2014 with only 12 services a day until all services were fully suspended due to the lack of rolling stock. After a much-delayed completion of the electrification of the line and the construction of Krung Thep Aphiwat Central Terminal, the line finally opened for trial operations on 2 August 2021.

Full commercial services commenced on 29 November 2021. A  extension of the line from Taling Chan to Salaya has been delayed for tender until June 2022.

Route Alignment
The  section runs from Krung Thep Aphiwat Central Terminal (the new Intercity Terminal in Chatuchak District) to Bang Son where it interchanges with the MRT Purple Line. It then continues west and crosses the Chao Phraya River to the Thonburi side of Bangkok before continuing farther west to Taling Chan where it terminates. Krung Thep Aphiwat Central Terminal Intercity Terminal provides interchange with the SRT Dark Red Line and MRT Blue Line. Finally, the line will be extended south from Krung Thep Aphiwat Central Terminal via Phaya Thai and then east to Hua Mak Railway Station in the east of Bangkok where it will interchange with the MRT Yellow Line.

History
In 2004, in conjunction with OTP, the SRT began formulating plans for a new, modern suburban network in Bangkok along existing SRT alignments to replace the existing, limited services. On 7 November 2006, the Thai Cabinet passed a resolution to approve the framework of the new network with the SRT Light Red line being DMU operations while the SRT Dark red Light would be EMU. The Cabinet approved the line on 22 May 2007 with a budget of 13.133 billion baht. Contracts for construction of the line from Taling Chan to Bang Sue were awarded by the SRT on 29 September 2009. The contract was signed on 15 December 2008, with the contract awarded to the Unique-Chun Wo consortium.

Construction 

Construction started in early 2010 after some site access delays related to slum dwellers who had been residing various sections of SRT land for many years. Works progressed well but were thereafter delayed for a few months due to the late 2011 floods in Bangkok wth floodwaters inundated on parts of the route. Construction was completed by the 3rd quarter of 2012. Testing began in September 2012 for a 3-month period.

2012-4 trial operation and suspension 
The line opened for free limited trial service on 5 December 2012 between Taling Chan Station and Bang Son Station. The line was operated with 2 refurbished DMUs running a very limited service. There were only 6 services each way a day every 60 minutes from 6am to 8am and from 4pm to 7pm. As such, only a few hundred passengers a day rode the service. On 14 September 2013, weekend services were cancelled. Effective 13 January 2014, all services were suspended until electrification works could be completed and rolling stock procured which was expected to be by the end of 2018.

Electrification and 2021 opening 

The reopening of the SRT Light Red line was contingent upon the completion of the new Bang Sue Intercity Terminal, delivery of rolling stock and installation of the overhead catenary electrical system between Bang Sue–Taling Chan which was funded as part of the SRT Dark Red Line contract 3 as the SRT had subsequently decided to change the line from DMU to EMU operations. Full electrification was planned to be completed by 2020 when the SRT Dark Red line was completed. By the end of September 2019, Electrical and Signaling installation was at 45.60%.

By June 2020, installation of the catenary system was at 76.82%. The line was expected to reopen in January 2021 after test runs began in late October 2020. In mid-November 2020, the Minister of Transport announced that free trial operations would operate from March to May 2021 with full-service operations expected in November 2021. In late February 2021, the SRT confirmed that free trial operations would commence on 26 March 2021 with full commercial operations starting on 28 July 2021. In July, the SRT postponed the service and the free trial operations commenced on 2 August 2021 with full commercial operations due to start on 28 November 2021.

Rolling stock

In April 2014, only 2 bidders remained but one of the bidding consortiums was disqualified on due to the fact that one of the consortium members (Marubeni Corporation) had convictions for bribery in an Indonesian bidding process.

This left the MHSC Consortium (consisting of Mitsubishi Heavy Industries, Hitachi, and Sumitomo Corporation) as the sole bidder qualified for the contract. However, their bid of 28,899 billion Baht was above the SRT median price of 26 billion baht which was set in 2010. The MHSC Consortium argued that their bid reflected 2013 prices after the national minimum wage increase from 1 January 2012. Finally in July 2014, after a 2-year delay in the bidding process JICA approved the loan for Contract 3. However, the coup of May 2014 delayed finalization leading to further review and negotiations. By mid-2016, negotiations had concluded and Hitachi promised that all rolling stock for the Dark Red line would be delivered by 2020. The contract specified 25 EMUs consisting of ten 4 car sets and fifteen 6 car sets for 130 cars in total.

In late September 2019, the first 2 sets of rolling stock were shipped from Japan and both arrived in Thailand at Laem Chabang port on 12 October 2019 for shipment to Bangkok. By March 2020, 5 sets had been delivered. As of July 2020, 13 sets - 7 of the 6 car sets and 6 of the 4 car sets - of the ordered 25 sets of rolling stock had been delivered with a further 2 sets due to be delivered by August 2020. By the end of September 2020, 21 sets had been delivered - 13 of the 6 car sets and 8 of the 4 car sets - with the final 4 sets to be delivered in October.

Operation
Services operate between 5:30am to 12am. Headways during the trial period are every 30 minutes except for the peak periods (7am to 9am and 5pm to 7pm) where services depart every 15 minutes.

Distance-based fares range from 12 to 42 baht.

Ridership
On the first full day of free trial operations on 3 August 2021 total passengers numbered 302, on 4 August this increased to 331 passengers. By the end of September, this had increased to around 500-550 passengers a day.

Future extensions
In July 2016, the cabinet approved the construction of the Bang Sue–Phaya Thai–Makkasan–Hua Mak segment. However, the tender has further been delayed until 2021 as the Transport Minister has requested the new Department of Railways to investigate conducting PPP tenders for this extension. On 10 February 2021, the Department of Railways announced that in April 2021 the SRT would issue the tenders for the west extensions to Salaya and from Taling Chan to Siriraj. However, the PPP tender process was subject to further review. In October 2021, the SRT announced that the PPP tenders would not be released until June 2022 with the aim to sign contracts for the extensions (with 50 year leases) in July 2023.

Construction segments based on M-Map:

Phase II Taling Chan–Salaya Extension

The western extension from Taling Chan to Salaya was originally planned to be tendered by September 2018 after receiving Thai Cabinet approval in July 2016. This was then delayed to the 2nd half of 2019. However, the tender has further been delayed until 2021 as the Transport Minister has requested the new Department of Railways to investigate conducting PPP tenders for this extension.

Phase III Taling Chan–Siriraj spur line
The SRT operates existing intercity services from Thonburi station to Kanchanaburi. This line is planned to be converted to a spur line of the existing Light Red line, from Taling Chan to Thonburi/Siriraj. In August 2012, the SRT proposed that 3 stations be built for this 6.5 km route:

Phase IV Bang Sue–Hua Mak 
There will be stations at Ratchawithi, Phaya Thai, Makkasan, and Hua Mak.

This section will be progressed once Krung Thep Aphiwat Central Terminal is fully open. It will have a narrow right of way given the current ARL viaduct and ARL stations.

Infill stations 
Two additional infill stations on either side of the Chao Praya river have been approved to be built, at Rama 6 bridge and Bang Kruay (EGAT). However, as of November 2021 no contracts have been tendered to build these two stations which will be included with the Salaya extension tender.

Stations

Network Map

See also

 Mass Rapid Transit Master Plan in Bangkok Metropolitan Region
 SRT Dark Red Line
 Airport Rail Link (Bangkok)
 MRT (Bangkok)
 MRT Blue Line
 MRT Brown Line
 MRT Grey Line
 MRT Light Blue Line
 MRT Orange Line
 MRT Pink Line
 MRT Purple Line
 MRT Yellow Line
 BTS Skytrain
 BTS Sukhumvit Line
 BTS Silom Line
 Bangkok BRT
 BMA Gold Line

References

External links

 "SRT Red Line website"
 Airport Rail Link, BTS, MRT & BRT network map

Light
Bangkok Commuter rail lines